Still Life Still is a Canadian indie rock group, formed in 1999, proudly calling East York (Toronto, ONT) home. The band's line-up has undergone many minor changes over the many years, but the core  has always consisted of guitarists/vocalists Brendon Saarinen and Eric Young, bassist Derek Paulin, drummer Aaron Romaniuk and his brother, keyboardist/percussionist Josh Romaniuk. In the late 2000's they earned "the next big thing" title according to fans, friends, media, labels, and the industry itself. Not an easy task for 20 somethings struggling with every day life as we all do.

History
The band was formed in 1999 and is made up of a group of friends who grew up together in the Woodbine-Lumsden neighbourhood of East York when its original four members (Romaniuk, Young, Paulin and Saarinen) were in elementary school. The group originally played under the names Unreal and El Mo before finally changing to Still Life Still. After many local gigs, they were discovered by fledgling indie DIY label and studio Mushroom Productions, who heard (via MySpace) and soon after saw their early potential at an NXNE fest in 2005, met with them at that gig and invited them to record and develop.  A week later they were in the studio recording and practicing everything they had. Obviously they were ahead of the times, and ahead of the game, being in the "game" for so long already. This led to the first live recording of many of their early, pivotal songs as they learned the behind the scenes of dealing of recording and becoming serious as a band, a commitment to their art. And it's not easy, it takes hard work and dedication. They had the skill from the beginning, the talent, way ahead of their times (being 18-21), writing (especially lyrically and I mean way ahead of the times), connection to one another, and connection with the audience. Destined to be a band that changed the world.  Mushroom released 2 full albums of early live recordings, (they jammed everything they had, and it changed everyone's life with the potential and quality, sometimes with 7-9 artists participating) and 2 demo ep's that were released in 2006 and 2007, by Mushroom (although physical copies are rare) with the current line up, featuring Alanna J Brown, who grew up with the band. Soon after, the band was on the radar of the TO scene in a big way, playing NXNE 2007 with 2 critics picks as the show to be at. Dubbed "East York Social Scene". While recording at Mushroom north of the city, both parties connected with the legendary William New of the Drake Underground, who gave them a real opportunity to shine, and a connection that would lead to a rabid fan base. A short time later, Kevin Drew was at a show at the Cameron House to see the band, and they were soon signed to Arts & Crafts. Come 2009 they were headliners for NOW Magazine's NXNE issue after being signed by their dream label. These guys had the talent and connections to be the "next big thing".  

Still Life Still signed to Canadian indie rock label Arts & Crafts and began recording with Broken Social Scene's Kevin Drew and Martin Davis Kinack in 2008.

Their first commercial EP, Pastel, was released in June, 2009. Soon  after, the band's first full-length album, Girls Come Too, was released in August of that year. All the songs were performed and written by the band members.  The lyrics contain explicit sexual references.

The band toured most of North America with The Most Serene Republic and The Hold Steady to promote Girls Come Too and appeared on MTV Canada's MTV Live in the summer of 2009.

In early 2012 their song "Neon Blue" from Girls Come Too was featured in the romantic drama The Vow, which was filmed primarily in the band's hometown of Toronto.

Still Life Still worked on their second full-length studio album, Mourning Trance. The first song from the album, "Burial Suit", was released online by Rolling Stone Magazine on April 25, 2013, followed by the first official single from the album, "In Enemies", on June 3, 2013. Mourning Trance was released on August 20, 2013. They are currently listed by their label as "non-active".

What could have been???

Discography

 Live at Mushroom 2006 - 15 tracks
 Mushroom Demo One 2006 - 4 tracks 
 Mushroom Demo Two 2007 - 3 tracks (+ 3 bonus tracks)
 High Score live recording 2007 - 20 tracks

Albums
 Girls Come Too (2009) 
Track listing:
 "Danse Cave" 		- 3:41
 "Flowers and a Wreath"  	- 3:34
 "Kid"  	- 3:23
 "Lite Bright Lawns" 	- 1:23
 "Neon Blue" 	- 3:20
 "Pastel" 	- 3:32
 "Planets" 	- 3:57
 "Knives in Cartoons" 	- 3:15
 "T-Shirts" 	- 2:01
 "Scissors Losing Weight" 	- 3:19
 "Wild Bees" 	- 12:06

 Mourning Trance (2013)

EPs
 Pastel (2009)

References

External links
 Official web site
 www.arts-crafts.ca/artists at Arts & Crafts Artist Listing
 Blog TO Article - Drummer Aaron Romaniuk talks about signing with Arts & Crafts
 Sound track list from The Vow  

Musical groups established in 1999
Canadian indie rock groups
Musical groups from Toronto
Arts & Crafts Productions artists
1999 establishments in Ontario